Kronborg is a castle and stronghold in the town of Helsingør, Denmark. Immortalized as Elsinore in William Shakespeare's play Hamlet, Kronborg is one of the most important Renaissance castles in Northern Europe and was inscribed on the UNESCO's World Heritage List in 2000.

The castle is situated on the extreme northeastern tip of the island of Zealand at the narrowest point of the Øresund, the sound between present Denmark and the provinces of present Sweden that were also Danish at the time the castle was built.

The castle's story dates back to a stronghold, Krogen, built by King Eric VII in the 1420s. Along with the fortress Kärnan in Helsingborg on the opposite coast of Øresund, it controlled the entranceway to the Baltic Sea. From 1574 to 1585, King Frederick II had the medieval fortress radically transformed into a magnificent Renaissance castle. The main architects were the Flemings Hans Hendrik van Paesschen and Anthonis van Obbergen, whereas the sculptural work was coordinated by Gert van Groningen.

In 1629, a fire destroyed much of the castle, but King Christian IV subsequently had it rebuilt. The castle also has a church within its walls. In 1658, Kronborg was besieged and captured by the Swedes who took many of its valuable art treasures as war booty. In 1785 the castle ceased to be a royal residence and was converted into barracks for the Army. The Army left the castle in 1923, and after a thorough renovation it was opened to the public.

History

Krogen
The castle's story dates back to a fortress, Krogen (lit. "the Hook"), built in the early 1400s by the Danish king, Eric of Pomerania. The king insisted on the payment of sound dues by all ships wishing to enter or leave the Baltic Sea through the Øresund; to help enforce his demands, he built a powerful fortress at the narrowest point in the Sound. At the time, the Kingdom of Denmark extended across both sides of the Sound, and on the eastern shore the Helsingborg Castle had been in existence since the Middle Ages. With the two castles and guard ships it was possible to control all navigation through the Sound.

The castle was built on Ørekrog, a sandy tongue of land stretching into the sea from the coast of Zealand towards the coast of Scania. The castle consisted of a square curtain wall with a number of stone buildings inside. The stone building in the northeastern corner contained the king's residence. The building in the southwestern corner contained a large arched banquet hall. The building in the southeastern corner possibly served as the chapel. Large portions of the walls of Krogen are contained within the present-day Kronborg Castle.

King Christian III had the corners of the curtain wall supplemented with bastions in 1558–1559.

Frederick II's Kronborg

As a consequence of developments in the military technique of the era and the improved striking power of the artillery, it became clear that it was necessary to modernize the fortifications of Krogen. After the conclusion of the Northern Seven Years' War in 1570, King Frederick II initiated an extension of the advanced bastions to relieve the medieval curtain wall. The main architect was the Flemish architect Hans Hendrik van Paesschen and the fortification works were completed in 1577. After this, the castle acquired its current name of Kronborg.

The castle itself was rebuilt from 1574 to 1585, with the separated buildings of Krogen being extended to three coherent wings. The north wing was equipped with chambers for the king, queen and her ladies-in-waiting as well as for the chancellery. In the south wing, the medieval building in the southeast corner was refitted as a modern chapel with the vaulted windows facing the chapel being retained. Frederick was a keen patron of theatre and players performed at the castle when he held court there in 1579.

Initially, the castle was reconstructed only to a height of two storeys. In 1578, however, the Flemish architect Anthonis van Obbergen was engaged as new master builder and work was undertaken to make Kronborg even larger and more magnificent. The sculptural work was coordinated by Gert van Groningen. As a sign of the new ambitions, the south wing was heightened by one storey and a new, gigantic ball room placed over the chapel. Soon after the west and north wings were also heightened by one storey. Finally, the east wing was also heightened with a passageway, The Queen's Gallery, allowing the Queen comfortable passage from her chambers in the north wing to the ball room in the south wing.  The exterior walls were clad with sandstone from Scania, and the new castle was given a roof with copper sheeting.

James VI of Scotland stayed in the castle in 1590 after his marriage to Anne of Denmark. King James gave 2,000 Danish dalers in gold coins to the officers and servants in the castle as a reward.

Fire of 1629

In 1629, a moment's carelessness by two workmen caused much of the castle to go up in flames in the night between the 24 and 25 September. Only the chapel was spared by the strength of its arches. King Christian IV put great efforts into restoring the castle. Already in 1631, the work was underway, led by the architect Hans van Steenwinckel the Younger. By 1639, the exterior — which in keeping with the king's wish was reconstructed without major changes — was once again magnificent, but the interior never fully regained its former glory. Furthermore, certain modernizations were made, and portals, chimneypieces, ceiling paintings and other decorations were renewed in Baroque style.

Swedish conquest of 1658

During the Dano-Swedish War of 1658–60, Kronborg was besieged, attacked and conquered by a Swedish army commanded by Carl Gustaf Wrangel. During the Swedish occupation, the queen of Sweden, Hedvig Eleonora of Holstein-Gottorp and the Swedish king's sister Maria Eufrosyne of Pfalz lived at Kronborg, where they were visited by Charles X of Sweden during the campaign and entertained the foreign ambassadors.

As a result of the Swedish occupation, Kronborg was deprived of many of its most precious art works, including the richly decorated fountain in the castle courtyard, Frederick II's canopy and a number of the large ceiling paintings commissioned by Christian IV for the ballroom.

Garrison fortress

The Swedish conquest of Kronborg in 1658 demonstrated that the castle was far from impregnable. Afterwards, the defences were strengthened significantly. From 1688 to 1690, an advanced line of defence was added called the Crownwork. Shortly afterwards, a new series of ramparts were built around it. After their completion, Kronborg was considered the strongest fortress in Europe.

From 1739 until the 20th century, Kronborg was used as a prison. The inmates were guarded by the soldiers billeted in the castle. The convicts had been sentenced to work on the castle's fortifications. The convicts were divided into two categories: those with minor sentences were categorised as "honest" and were allowed to work outside the castle walls; those serving sentences for violence, murder, arson or the like were categorised as "dishonest" and had to serve the full sentence doing hard physical labour inside the castle ramparts. Otherwise, they served their time under the same conditions: they all had to wear chains and spend nights in cold and damp dungeons. From January 17, 1772, to April 30, 1772, Kronborg was the place of imprisonment of Queen Caroline Mathilde, sister of King George III, following the scandal of her affair with Johann Friedrich Struensee.

As Kronborg's importance as a royal castle diminished, the armed forces came to play a greater role. From 1785 to 1922, the castle was completely under military administration. During this period, a number of renovations were completed.

Sound Dues and recent history
The captain of every ship sailing through the strait had to state the value of ship's cargo. Money that had to be paid to the King of Denmark, called Sound Dues, was then calculated depending on the value of the cargo. The king had the right to buy the cargo for the price the ship's captain stated. This policy prevented captains from stating prices that were too low. The Royal Danish Army left the castle in 1923, and after a thorough renovation it was opened to the public in 1938.

Kronborg today 

Kronborg Castle is located on the extreme northeastern tip of the island of Zealand, to the northeast of the historic centre of the town of Helsingør. It is situated at an elevation of 12 metres, on a small foreland jutting out into the narrowest point of the Øresund, the sound between the Danish island of Zealand and the Swedish province of Scania, that was also Danish until 1658. The approach from the town is to the east, with a series of moats and gates protecting the route from the town to the castle itself.

Royal apartments 

The royal apartments are located on the first floor of the north wing. The apartments were originally furnished by Frederick II around 1576, but after the fire in 1629, Christian IV had the apartments refurnished and richly decorated with ceiling paintings, stone portals and chimneypieces. The original floors were tiled in black and white which were replaced with wooden floorboards in 1760–61, and the walls were clad in gilt-leather. Today the chambers are furnished with Netherlandish furniture from the 17th century.

The King's Chamber has a bay window, located right above the castle's main portal, from which the king could keep an eye on guests arriving at the castle, whereas the Queen's Chamber has access to a vaulted tower chamber overlooking the Flag Bastion.

Ballroom 

Measuring 62 x 12 metres, the Ballroom was the largest hall in Northern Europe when it was completed in 1582. The walls are hung with a series of large paintings which were originally made from 1618 to 1631 for the Great Hall of Rosenborg Castle in Copenhagen.
The present floor and the fireplaces are from the rebuilding in 1924–38.

Little Hall 

The walls of the Little Hall are furnished with seven tapestries originally from a series of forty tapestries portraying one hundred Danish kings. The masterpieces include Tapestry depicting Oluf (1376-1387) and Tapestry depicting Knud VI (1182-1202). The tapestries were commissioned by Frederick II around 1580. Seven more tapestries are at the National Museum of Denmark, while the rest have been lost.

Chapel 

The chapel is located in the ground floor of the south wing and was inaugurated in 1582. In 1785, as the castle was being fitted for use as army barracks, the chapel was fitted out as a gymnasium and fencing hall and the furniture stored away. The chapel was refurnished with the original furniture in 1838 and reinaugurated in 1843.

Cultural significance

Hamlet
Kronborg is depicted as "Elsinore", the setting of William Shakespeare's tragedy Hamlet, Prince of Denmark, though "Elsinore" is actually the anglicised name of the surrounding town of Helsingør.  Hamlet was performed in the castle for the first time to mark the 200th anniversary of the death of William Shakespeare, with a cast consisting of soldiers from the castle garrison. The stage was in the telegraph tower in the southwest corner of the castle.

The play has since been performed several times in the courtyard and at various locations on the fortifications. Later performers to play Hamlet at the castle included Laurence Olivier, John Gielgud, Christopher Plummer, Derek Jacobi, David Tennant, and in 2009 Jude Law. In 2017, Hamletscenen presented a production of William Shakespeare's Hamlet at Kronborg castle, directed by Lars Romann Engel; the role of Hamlet was played by Cyron Melville and Ophelia by Natalie Madueño; music for the production was composed by Mike Sheridan.

Ogier the Dane

According to a legend linked to Arthurian myth, a Danish king known as Ogier the Dane (Danish: Holger Danske), was taken to Avalon by the enchantress Morgan le Fay. Ogier returned to rescue France from danger, then travelled to Kronborg castle, where he sleeps until he is needed to save his homeland. His beard has grown to extend along the ground. A statue of the sleeping Ogier (right) has been placed in the castle casemates.

Culture Harbour Kronborg
Kulturhavn Kronborg is an initiative of 2013 to offer a variety of culture experiences to residents and visitors to Helsingør. Kulturhavn Kronborg is a joint initiative by Kronborg Castle, Danish Maritime Museum, Kulturværftet and Helsingør harbour.

Other
The castle was the setting of the televised holiday series Jul på Kronborg, which featured both Hamlet and Holger the Dane. 'Elsinore Beer' is named for the castle and shown in the beer label logo in the 1983 comedy Strange Brew, starring Rick Moranis and Dave Thomas.

See also 
 Kronborg Glacier
 List of castles and palaces in Denmark
 Tourism in Denmark

References
Notes

Bibliography

External links 

Kronborg Castle website 
UNESCO's page on Kronborg Castle
Kronborg Castle picture gallery at Remains.se
The Association of Castles and Museums around the Baltic Sea

Infrastructure completed in 1585
16th-century fortifications
Castles in Denmark
Forts in Denmark
Helsingør
World Heritage Sites in Denmark
1420s establishments in Europe
15th-century establishments in Denmark
Coastal fortifications
Listed buildings and structures in Helsingør Municipality
Star forts
Museums in the Capital Region of Denmark
Historic house museums in Denmark
Caroline Matilda of Great Britain
Burned buildings and structures
Royal residences in Denmark